Four Factions may refer to:

Political factions in Iran
Political factions in Joseon Dynasty